Convolvulus siculus is a species of annual herb in the family Convolvulaceae. They have a self-supporting growth form and simple, broad leaves and dry fruit. Individuals can grow to 39 cm tall.

Sources

References 

siculus
Flora of Malta